Pally Babu Mohan known as Babu Mohan is an Indian actor and politician from Bharatiya Janata Party. He prominently works in Telugu films as a comedian and is a former Minister for Labour in Andhra Pradesh. He won Nandi Award for Best Male Comedian for his role in Mamagaru.

Early life
Babu Mohan was born in Beerolu, Khammam district of Telangana, India. His father was a teacher. He worked as a government employee in the revenue department of Andhra Pradesh. He later left this job to pursue his interest in films.

Film career
Babu Mohan debuted in the film Ee Prasnaku Baduledi, followed by Ahuthi (directed by Kodi Ramakrishna), Ankusam and then a comedy character in Mamagaru. The last of these established his reputation as a comedian. After this film, Babu Mohan and Kota Srinivasa Rao developed a comedy partnership and are one of the most celebrated duos, for which many producers created special characters. The pair played in Mayalodu, Rajendrudu Gajendrudu, and other films, the majority of which were directed by S. V. Krishna Reddy.

Babu Mohan also paired with Brahmanandam. Their films include Hello Brother, Varasudu, Allari Alludu, Pedarayudu, Paradesi, Appula Appa Rao and Jamba Lakidi Pamba.

Political career
He was first elected as an MLA in the 1998 by-elections and retained the seat in 1999 from Andole Assembly constituency in Medak district serving as a Minister for Labour  in the Chandrababu Naidu's cabinet. In the general elections, held in 2004 and 2009, he lost to the previous Deputy Chief Minister Damodar Raja Narasimha. In the year 2014, he quit Telugu Desam Party to join Telangana Rashtra Samithi.

He joined Telangana Rashtra Samithi and in 2014 general elections he won again as an MLA from the same constituency against Damodar Raja Narasimha. Later in the year 2018, he joined Bharatiya Janata Party.

Personal life
Mohan is married to Indira Vijaya Lakshmi. Their eldest son, Pally Pavan Kumar, died in a road accident on 12 October 2003.

Filmography

References

External links
 

|}

Living people
Male actors from Hyderabad, India
Telugu Desam Party politicians
Telugu comedians
Indian male film actors
Indian actor-politicians
Telugu politicians
Members of the Andhra Pradesh Legislative Assembly
Telangana MLAs 2014–2018
Male actors in Telugu cinema
20th-century Indian male actors
21st-century Indian male actors
Politicians from Hyderabad, India
People from Medak district
1952 births
Indian Christians